Prince Giuseppe of Naples and Sicily (Giuseppe Carlo Gennaro; 18 June 1781 – 19 February 1783) was the first "Prince of Naples and Sicily". The title was later conferred by Joseph Bonaparte to be hereditary on his children and grandchildren.

Biography

Prince Giuseppe (Joseph) was born at the Royal Palace of Naples to King Ferdinand IV of Naples and his Austrian consort Maria Carolina of Austria, daughter of Empress Maria Theresa.

A member of the House of Bourbon, he was a Prince of Naples and Sicily by birth.

He was the ninth child of his parents and their fourth son. At the time of his birth, he was third in line to the throne after his brother Prince Francis, then Duke of Calabria and Prince Gennaro. His oldest brother Carlo, Duke of Calabria (d.1778) died of smallpox aged 3 and the next in line, Francis became heir apparent.

His sisters included the future Holy Roman Empress, Grand Duchess of Tuscany. His younger sister, Princess Maria Cristina, was the wife of the future Charles Felix of Sardinia and Queen of Sardinia. Another sister was the Queen of the French and the youngest was the future Princess of Asturias.

His cousins included a Duke of Parma,  Grand Duke of Tuscany, Holy Roman Emperor, Queen of Portugal, King of Spain, a Duchess of Calabria, the first wife of his older brother Ferdinand.

At the age of 20 months the prince caught smallpox which eventually killed him. He died at the Caserta Palace and was buried at the Basilica of Santa Chiara, Naples.

Ancestry

References and notes

1781 births
1783 deaths
18th-century Neapolitan people
House of Bourbon-Two Sicilies
Neapolitan princes
Sicilian princes
Deaths from smallpox
Burials at the Basilica of Santa Chiara
Royalty and nobility who died as children
Sons of kings